, also romanised as Seiyu Itoh (3 March 1882 in Tokyo – 28 January 1961 in Tokyo) was a Japanese painter, recognised today as "the father of modern kinbaku". Ito's life was the subject of director Noboru Tanaka's 1977 Nikkatsu Roman porno film Beauty's Exotic Dance: Torture!, the final entry in his "Showa Era trilogy".

Biography
Ito was born  in Asakusa district and started his education in painting by 1890. His father was a metalworker and he also received training in ivory carving, later sculpture. He adopted the alias Seiu (Sino-Japanese reading of kanji for words 'clear' and 'rain') at age 13. Around 1907, he began working for newspapers.

Ito hired a young art school model named Kise Sahara in 1919. Kise became Ito's second wife after she got pregnant and posed willingly for her husband.

Ito became the target of censors in 1930, which led to draining of his fortunes and he lost his works at the Great Tokyo Air Raid.

Style
As an artist, Ito was very interested in kabuki and other ways of the Edo period and his book  was published after the Kanto earthquake. His technique for depiction of Edo period tortures was to bind his model in various ways, have the photographs taken, and use them as inspiration for his paintings. A notorious exploit of such kind was binding his pregnant wife Kise and having her suspended upside down for a drawing imitating the ukiyo-e The Lonely House on Adachi Moor in Michinoku Province by Yoshitoshi.

References

1882 births
1961 deaths
BDSM people
Bondage artists
Bondage riggers
Artists from Tokyo
20th-century Japanese painters